Mummies, is a 2023 English-language Spanish computer-animated comedy film directed by Juan Jesús García Galocha (in his feature directorial debut) from a screenplay by Javier López Barreira and Jordi Gasull and a story by Gasull. It features the voices of Joe Thomas, Eleanor Tomlinson, Celia Imrie, Hugh Bonneville and Sean Bean.

The film follows three mummies on their journey to present-day London to search for an old ring belonging to a royal family, stolen by an ambitious archeologist. Initially scheduled for release in 2021, Mummies was theatrically released in Spain and in selected theatres in the United States on February 24, 2023.

Voice cast
Joe Thomas as Thut
Eleanor Tomlinson as Nefer
Karina Pasian as Nefer's singing voice
Celia Imrie as Mother Carnaby
Hugh Bonneville as Lord Sylvester Carnaby
Sean Bean as Pharaoh
Shakka as Ed
Santiago Winder as Sekhem
Dan Starkey as Danny and Dennys
 Oliver Lidert as Aida male lead
 Rachel Adedeji as Aida female lead

Release
Mummies was scheduled to be released in 2021 under the name Moomios as part of a partnership between Atresmedia Cine and Warner Bros. España. However, it was later delayed to 2023 after two years of extended production and was changed to its current name. The first trailer was released on October 31, 2022. The film was released in Spain and in selected theatres in the United States by Warner Bros. Pictures on February 24, 2023. The film was first released in international territories, beginning with Australia, on January 5, 2023. The film will later be released in the UK and Ireland on March 31, 2023 and HBO Max. The soundtrack was released Digital by WaterTower Music on February 24, 2023 on streaming services including Apple Music, Spotify, and Pandora.

Reception 
On review aggregation website Rotten Tomatoes, the film has an approval rating of 70% based on 10 reviews with an average rating of 6/10.

See also 
 List of Spanish films of 2023

References

External links 
 
 

2020s animated films
2020s Spanish films
English-language Spanish films
Films set in the United Kingdom
Films set in Egypt
Films scored by Fernando Velázquez
2023 computer-animated films
2023 films
2023 directorial debut films
2020s English-language films
Spanish computer-animated films
Atresmedia Cine films
Warner Bros. animated films
Warner Bros. films